Samir Mondal (born 13 March 1952) is an Indian watercolour painter. His main contribution to Indian art of modern times is a continual revival of watercolour painting.

Early life and education
Born in Balti, a small village in North 24 Parganas district, West Bengal, Mondal graduated in fine arts from the Government College of Art & Craft, Kolkata in 1975. Thereafter he went to Germany for higher studies.

Personal life
He married Madhumita in 1980. They have two children, Somak and Sohini. He lives and works in Goregaon West, Mumbai.

Career
Mondal started his solo career in 1980, and after a brief stay in Bangalore, settled in Bombay (now Mumbai). Here by 1987, he was illustrating political cartoons in water colour for noted magazine Illustrated Weekly of India.

Over the past four decades he has done solo and group exhibitions in India and abroad. These include, National Art exhibition of Lalit Kala Akademi (Delhi), ‘Freedom of Expression’ and ‘Tribute to Mother Teresa’ by RPG Enterprises, 100 Years of Indian Cinema, People for Animals, ‘Art with a Heart’ at National Gallery of Modern Art, Mumbai, ‘Celebrations-97’ at Napa Art Gallery, Nepal, ‘Confluence’ at Art Connoisseur Gallery, London and Gallery Asiana, New York in collaboration with Gallery Sumukha, Bangalore. Another exhibition titled "6x10" featuring his 60 paintings of flowers, held at the Jamaat Art Gallery in Colaba, Mumbai.

Another notable work includes  painting for the 2007 Hindi film, Taare Zameen Par, Mondal  painted two watercolour paintings which characters Ishaan and Nikumbh, played by Darsheel Safary and Aamir Khan respectively

Awards
 Awards: 1970, 1972, 1973, 1974 Government College of Art & Craft, Kolkata
 Awards: 1978, 1983 Best Painting Award 'All India'  – Academy of Fine Arts, Kolkata 
 Awards: 1979, 1983 West Bengal State Academy, Kolkata 
 Award: 1986 AIFACS all India Exhibition, New Delhi 
 Award: 1995 A.P.Council of Artists, Hyderabad

References

External links
 Official website

Indian male painters
1952 births
Living people
Government College of Art & Craft alumni
People from North 24 Parganas district
Bengali male artists
Indian watercolourists
20th-century Indian painters
21st-century Indian painters
Painters from West Bengal
20th-century Indian male artists
21st-century Indian male artists